Isopogon buxifolius is a species of plant in the family Proteaceae and is endemic to the south-west of Western Australia. It is an upright shrub with egg-shaped to elliptic or oblong leaves and clustered spikes of pink flowers.

Description

Taxonomy
Isopogon buxifolius was first formally described in 1810 by Robert Brown in the Transactions of the Linnean Society of London.

In 1870, George Bentham described four varieties of I. buxifolius in Flora Australiensis and two of his names are accepted by the Australian Plant Census:
 Isopogon buxifolius var. obovatus (R.Br.) Benth.

Bentham's I. buxifolius var. linearis and var. spathulatus are now regarded as a synonyms of I. spathulatus.

Distribution and habitat
Variety buxifolius grows in swampy areas between Collie, Denmark and Albany and var. obovatus has been recorded in sandy loam over laterite in a small area between the Stirling Range, Cape Riche and Bremer Bay.

Conservation status
Variety buxifolius is classified as  "Priority Two" by the Government of Western Australia Department of Parks and Wildlife, meaning that it is poorly known and from only one or a few locations and var. obovatus as "Priority Three", meaning that it is poorly known and known from only a few locations but is not under imminent threat.

References

buxifolius
Endemic flora of Western Australia
Eudicots of Western Australia
Plants described in 1810
Taxa named by Robert Brown (botanist, born 1773)